Patsy Gleaton Knight (born December 9, 1938) is an American politician. She is a member of the South Carolina House of Representatives from the 97th District, serving since 2006. She is a member of the Democratic party.

References

Living people
1938 births
Democratic Party members of the South Carolina House of Representatives
21st-century American politicians

Women state legislators in South Carolina